Innathe Chinthavishayam is a 2008 Indian Malayalam-language family drama film written and directed by Satyan Anthikad. The film, produced by Antony Perumbavoor through Aashirvad Cinemas, stars Mohanlal and Meera Jasmine. The film's score and songs were composed by Ilayaraja. The film is based on the scenario of increased divorces in modern-day Kerala middle class society. The film was released on 12 April 2008.

Plot
Dr. Murali Krishnan, the most successful dentist in the city is more interested in having female associations, more than often. He hides them from his wife Treesa, even by assigning male names for them in his mobile. One fine day he is in a tight corner with Treesa raiding his mobile contacts, and for evading the conflicts associated, he walks out of her life even leaving his daughter Lakshmi and Treesa became a driving instructor. Meanwhile, Treesa punishes Ranjan Philip, an womaniser who continuously follows and disturbs her by making him naked in a street, taking away his dress and keeping it in his car.

The second family, Pithambaran and his wife Premila with their lovely children Malavika and Madhavan are leading a good life. But due to increased possessiveness for Premila, Pithambaran returns home from gulf throwing away his good job, and starts escorting his wife all along. He even develops inferiority complex which further complicates things for Premila, ultimately resulting in continuous fights and separation.

And in the third family, Rehna is not able to continue with her lawyer profession due to the orthodox attitude of her husband Noushad and his family. She too walks out of his life, and starts working independently.

Into the lives of these three lady friends who start living separately arrives, Gopakumar alias G.K., a garment exporter. He has bought the house where Treesa is staying away from Muralikrishnan. Now left in a difficult situation which does not allow G.K., to throw out Treesa and her daughter, to establish his office, G.K. is trying newer ways to get the couple together. And in the process he meets the other similar ladies who happen to be friends of Treesa.

The film follows how G.K. with his fashion designer Kamala and land Broker Immanuel, succeeds in getting the feuding couples back to lives of reunion.

Cast

 Mohanlal as Gopakumar / G.K.
 Meera Jasmine as Kamala
Sukanya as Treesa Muralikrishnan
 Mukesh as Dr. Muralikrishnan
 Vijayaraghavan as Peethambaran
 Mohini as Premila Peethambaran
 Ashokan as Noushad
 Muthumani as Adv. Rehna Noushad 
 Innocent as Immanuel
 Mamukkoya as Shajahan
 Baby Niveditha as Lakshmi Muralikrishnan 
 Master Dhananjay as Madhavan 
 Baby Malavika as Malavika
 Master Ganapathi as appu, Kamala's brother
 Rajesh Hebbar as Ranjan Philip, an Eve Teaser
 Santhakumari as Amina, Noushad's House maid 
 Vanitha Krishnachandran as Lathika, Kamala's mother
 Thesni Khan as Nancy, Immanuel's wife
 Siddique as Santhosh, Kamala's Father 
 Jayan Cherthala as Jayarajan, Kamala's Uncle
 Sreelatha Namboothiri as Noushad's Mother
 Kalamandalam Radhika as Raziya, Noushad's Aunt
 Reshmi Boban as Soumini, Pramila's Sister
 Babu Namboothiri as Krishankutty, Premila's Father 
 Anoop Chandran
 Manjusha Sajish as Jamila, Noushad's Sister
 Kripa as Bhanumathi , Treesa's servant
 Ansiba Hassan as college student
 Althara as Seetha, Kamala's Sister 
 Shivaji Guruvayoor as Moosa, Noushad's Relative

Soundtrack

The songs in this movie were composed by music maestro Isaignani Ilaiyaraaja. The lyrics were penned by Gireesh Puthenchery.

Box office
It was a semi-hit at box office.

Awards
 Kerala State Film Award for Best Film with Popular Appeal and Aesthetic Value
 Kerala State Film Award, Jaihind TV Award for Best Comedy Artist - Mamukkoya
 Asianet Film Awards, Vanitha Film Awards for Best Male Playback Singer - M. G. Sreekumar

References

External links 
 

2008 films
2000s Malayalam-language films
2008 comedy films
Indian comedy films
Indian family films
Films with screenplays by Sathyan Anthikad
Films directed by Sathyan Anthikad
Films scored by Ilaiyaraaja
Films about families
Aashirvad Cinemas films